Copete is a Spanish surname. Notable people with the surname include:

 Yazmín Copete (born 1964), Mexican politician
 Andrés Copete (born 1983), Colombian football forward
 Jonathan Copete (born 1988), Colombian football winger
 Luis Fernando Copete (born 1989), Nicaraguan football centre-back
 Héctor Copete (born 1994), Colombian football defender
 José Manuel Copete (born 1999), Spanish football centre-back